Spalacopsis macra is a species of beetle in the family Cerambycidae. It was described by Tyson in 1973.

References

Spalacopsis
Beetles described in 1973